Adoration of the Magi is a circa 1650 religious painting by the Italian Baroque artist from Genoa, Valerio Castello. It is now in the Musée des Beaux-Arts of Strasbourg, France. Its inventory number is 1830.

Adoration of the Magi is today considered as a brilliant example of Ligurian Baroque, and three documented ancient copies have been identified. Strangely enough, the painting had an utterly inconspicuous existence until 2004, when it was identified as a major work by Castello – it had been passed as a "Dutch painting with Italian influences" since 1949. The Strasbourg museum also owns an Adoration of the Magi by Castello's disciple and assistant Bartolomeo Biscaino; that work had been attributed to Castello until 1959.

References 

Paintings in the collection of the Musée des Beaux-Arts de Strasbourg
1650s paintings
Baroque paintings
Oil on canvas paintings
Italian paintings
Castello